Ramiz Jaraisy (born October 24, 1951) is an Arab-Israeli politician and the former mayor of Nazareth.

Jaraisy was born in Israel. He holds a BSc in mechanical engineering (1973) and an MSc in civil engineering (1978), both from the Technion - Israel Institute of Technology. He established two Arab-Israeli student unions, first for the Technion, and subsequently a national chapter. Jaraisy is a Greek Orthodox Christian.

Jaraisy was first elected to the Nazareth City Council in 1978. Later he became deputy mayor under Tawfiq Ziad. After Ziad's death in 1994 he was elected mayor of Nazareth. He was beaten and succeeded by deputy mayor Ali Salam in 2014.

References

External links
Jaraisy biography

1951 births
Living people
Palestinian politicians
Arab politicians
Deputy mayors of places in Israel
Eastern Orthodox Christians from Palestine
Hadash politicians
Palestinian  Christians
Palestinian engineers
Mayors of Nazareth
Technion – Israel Institute of Technology alumni